Adventure Time is an American animated television series on Cartoon Network.

Adventure Time may also refer to:
 Adventure Time (1959 TV series), a children's television show in Pittsburgh
 Adventure Time (1967 TV series), a Canadian television series
 "Adventure Time" (short film), a 2007 pilot for the Cartoon Network series
 Adventure Time (franchise), a media franchise set around the Cartoon Network series
 Adventure Time (album), an album by the Elvis Brothers
 "Adventure Time", a 2003–2004 musical collaboration between Daedelus and DJ Frosty